Gymnogaster is a genus of fungi in the family Boletaceae. It is a monotypic genus, containing the single secotioid species Gymnogaster boletoides, found in Australia. The fungus produces bright yellow fruit bodies with a light brown internal gleba, and the fruit bodies turn blue then dark brown after bruising or handling.

Taxonomy and classification
The genus was circumscribed by Joan Cribb in 1956, based on specimens she found growing in the woods of Mount Glorious, Queensland in February the previous year. The genus differs from the similar Secotium in that it lacks a peridium. Cribb initially placed the genus within the Secotiaceae family, but this has since been made synonymous with the Agaricaceae. In his second (1962) edition of his influential Agaricales in Modern Taxonomy, Rolf Singer placed Gymnogaster in the Gastroboletaceae, (a family that has since been folded into the Boletaceae), in which he also included the genera Austrogaster, Truncocolumella, Gautieria, Chamonixia, Brauniellula, and Gastroboletus.

Description

The base of the fruit body is depressed and rounded, yellow; at the apex, the fixed part is russet red. The gleba is cellular, pale brown, and composed of labyrinthoid cells that are up to 1 mm in diameter. The flesh is 50–70 μm thick, with a wide expanse of woven hyphae. The spores are elliptical or ovate, brown, smooth, and measure 9.5–13 by 5.6–7.0 μm. The basidia are four-spored.

Fruit bodies of G. boletoides will turn bright blue immediately upon being handled or bruised, and slowly change color to dark brown. This is similar to the color reaction that occurs in several bolete mushrooms.

Habitat and distribution
Gymnogaster boletoides is suspected to be an ectomycorrhizal species. The fungus grows in wooded areas, and has been collected in Mount Glorious, Queensland, including Lamington National Park.

See also
 List of Agaricaceae genera
 List of Agaricales genera

References

External links
 

Agaricaceae
Monotypic Agaricales genera
Fungi of Australia
Taxa described in 1956